Diobesi is the name of a Thracian tribe. They are mentioned by Pliny the Elder.

References

See also
List of Thracian tribes

Ancient tribes in the Balkans
Thracian tribes